Bobby's Kitten (foaled March 30, 2011 in Kentucky) is an American Thoroughbred racehorse who won the 2014 Breeders' Cup Turf Sprint. A dark bay or brown colt sired by Kitten's Joy, and homebred by his owners Kenneth and Sarah Ramsey, he is trained by Chad Brown. In 2013 he won his second race as a two-year-old before going on to win his first graded stakes race, the Grade III Pilgrim Stakes at Belmont Park. Both races were at  miles.   He contested the Breeders' Cup Juvenile Turf that year and finished third.  In his three-year-pld year, he won two minor races with uneven results in graded stakes competition until his come-from-last victory in the 2014 Breeders' Cup Turf Sprint at  furlongs.

Pedigree

References

2011 racehorse births
Racehorses bred in Kentucky
Racehorses trained in the United States
Thoroughbred family 3-h
Breeders' Cup Turf Sprint winners